Stickfigure Records is an American record label based in Atlanta, Georgia.
It was created in the winter of 1992 to cater to the underground scene of independent music.

Stickfigure Releases
Airoes "my zipper got stuck" CD
Blame Game "anthology" CD;
Blame Game "Honey & Salt" CD
The Blessed "again, with hate" 7-inch
Camaro Crotch "triple picture disc discography"
Coulier "cool, cooler, coulier!" CD
Coulier "call and response" 7-inch
Dawnbreed- Luxus 7-inch
Death Of Marat - All Eyes Open CD
Deerhunter Turn It Up Faggot LP/CD
Electrosleep International "anthology volume 1-inch CD
eNTERTAINME.nt "safe at one" 7-inch
eNTERTAINME.nt - Gender
Feeding Fingers- Wound in Wall
Feeding Fingers- Baby Teeth
Femme Fatality "One's Not Enough" CD
Femme Fatality - Pretty Mess 7-inch
Femme Fatality -"That's It, That's It" CD
Graboids - Infinite Delay CD
I Would Set Myself on Fire for You s/t CD
I Would Set Myself on Fire for You- ...Believes In Patterns CD
Me and him call it us "loss"
Milemarker - Changing Caring Humans CD
Milemarker - Futurisms LP/CD
nerdkween Synergy CD
One Hand Loves The Other "One Hand Loves The Other" CD
One Hand Loves The Other "One Hand Loves The Remix" CD
The Paper Chase and Xiu Xiu "cover nick cave" split 7-inch
The Party of Helicopters - Abracadaver CD
Thoroughbred "s/t" 7-inch
Portrait s/t 7-inch
Retconned- Simulant Skin Included CD
Spiritworld "soul...sold it" 7-inch
Snowden "black eyes" 7-inch
Warning Light - Further On CD
Warning Light - Wild Silver CD
.you. "i am you" CD

References

External links
Stickfigure Records Official Website

American independent record labels